Anthinad is a small agricultural village in Kottayam district (Meenachil Taluk) situated about 6 kilometres away from Palai. The Main Eastern Highway (Muvattupuzha - Punalur Road) passes through Anthinad and connects it to two of its neighboring towns, Thodupuzha and Pala.

Landmarks 
 Sree Mahadeva Temple Anthinad
 St Joseph's Church, Anthinad

Hospitals 
 MKM Hospital, Pravithanam, Anthinad

Educational institutions 
 Govt. UPS Anthinad
 Santhinilayam Special school, Anthinad

Access 
Anthinad is 35 km away from Kottayam (6 km from Pala) and 22 km from Thodupuzha. Buses ply from Pala and Thodupuzha to Anthinad very frequently. The nearest airport located at Nedumbassery (Cochin International Airport) approximately 65 km away, and the railway station is located at Ettumanoor. Anthinad is situated 180 km north from the state capital Thiruvananthapuram.

Additional details 
 Post office: Anthinad
 PIN code: 686651
 Panchayat: Karoor
 Taluk: Meenachil
 Nearest places: Kollappally, Pravithanam
 Telephone code : 04822
 Vehicle registration : KL35
 Lok Sabha constituency : Kottayam
 Legislative Assembly : Pala

References

External links 

 http://www.smcim.org/house/anthinad

Villages in Kottayam district